Big Springs is an unincorporated community in Logan County, in the U.S. state of Ohio.

History
Big Springs was laid out in 1852, and named after a spring near the original town site. A post office called Big Springs was established in 1864, and remained in operation until 1935.

References

Unincorporated communities in Logan County, Ohio
1852 establishments in Ohio
Populated places established in 1852
Unincorporated communities in Ohio